Zefnoon Safai was elected to the Wolesi Jirga, the lower house of Afghanistan's National Assembly in 2005.
She sits on the legislature's budget committee.
She has a B.A., and was formerly a literacy teacher.

References

Members of the House of the People (Afghanistan)
Living people
21st-century Afghan women politicians
21st-century Afghan politicians
Year of birth missing (living people)